Ijara-Isin is a town in Isin Local Government Area in Kwara State, Nigeria. Isin Local Government Area of Kwara State was created from the old Irepodun Local Government Area in 1996 with the headquarters at Owu-Isin. It has an area of 633 km2 and a population of 59,738 at the 2006 census.

The postal code of the area is 251.

The Ijara-Isin people are stock of the Igbomina. Yoruba language is spoken in Ijara-Isin, however, the local dialect concurs as Igbomina. The founder of Ijara-Isin migrated from Oyo. However, there are some compound in Ijara-Isin Towns whose founders migrated from outside Oyo.

Ijara-Isin town is made of the following compounds:
1. Odo-Ijara Compound
2. Okegunsin Compound
3. Ile Olusin Compound
4. Ile-Nla Compound
5. Ajegunle Compound
6. Oke-Afin Compound
7. Ofatedo Compound
8. Ile Olowu Compound

The town of Ijara-Isin has both Baale and a Royal King.
The Baale is Chief Enoch Bamikole; while the Oba is by name OBA OMONIYI BANIGBE The Olusin of Ijara-Isin a 2nd Class Traditional Ruler.

References
 http://www.nipost.gov.ng

Populated places in Kwara State
Towns in Yorubaland